Felicia Greer is a former road cyclist from Canada. She represented her nation at the 2005 and 2008 UCI Road World Championships.

References

External links
 profile at Procyclingstats.com

Canadian female cyclists
Living people
Place of birth missing (living people)
1970 births
20th-century Canadian women
21st-century Canadian women